Robert Bale (fl. 1461), was a medieval English chronicler.

Bale, known as Robert Bale the Elder, is said to have been born in London. He practised as a lawyer, and was elected notary of the city of London, and subsequently a judge in the civil courts. He wrote a chronicle of the city of London, and collected the stray records of its usages, liberties, &c. The following is a list of his writings according to John Bale
 Londinensis Urbis Chronicon
 Instrumenta Libertatum Londini
 Gesta Regis Edwardi Tertii
 Alphabetum Sanctorum Angliæ
 De Præfectis et Consulibus Londini

References

Attribution

Year of birth missing
Year of death missing
15th-century English lawyers
English chroniclers
15th-century English writers
15th-century Latin writers
Writers from London